The 1893 Accrington by-election was held on 21 December 1893 after the incumbent Liberal MP Joseph Leese becoming the Recorder of Manchester and so having to stand for re-election as a paid government office.  Leese retained the seat.

The Conservative candidate, Robert Trotter Hodge had been the MP for Accrington from 1886 to 1892.

References 

By-elections to the Parliament of the United Kingdom in Lancashire constituencies
1893 elections in the United Kingdom
December 1893 events